George Buza is an American-born Canadian actor who is best known for voicing Beast in the X-Men Animated Series.

Personal life
Born in Cleveland, Ohio, he moved to Toronto, Ontario, as a young man and became a Canadian citizen in 1998.

Career
Buza played Turner Edison on Maniac Mansion for the entirety of its 1990-1993 run on YTV and The Family Channel. He also had a recurring role on the Red Green Show as Dwight Cardiff, the extremely lazy marina operator. He appeared as Chief Jake McKenna several times in the TV series Honey, I Shrunk the Kids: The TV Show. In addition, he portrayed Doubar, the older brother of Sinbad, in The Adventures of Sinbad syndicated TV series, as well as a recurring role on the syndicated Mutant X. Buza was also in episode 11 of TVOntario's Read All About It, and played Buck Norris on The Strain. He was one of the Kzamm tribe in Quest for Fire (film).

He also makes a small appearance as a trucker in 2000's X-Men movie, and a biker in George Romero's Diary of The Dead. He played Stuckmore in 2002's Men With Brooms. Buza also played Lenny "The Brain" Lepinski in the Quebec-Ontario TV show called "The Last Chapter". He also played Santa, the character that fought Krampus in the horror movie A Christmas Horror Story.

Voiceover work
Buza is probably best known for voicing Beast in the X-Men Animated Series. He also reprised the role in the video games X-Men: Children of the Atom and both X-Men: Mutant Academy games.

Buza has also provided character voices in many animated series. He voiced Grandpa Granger in the English dub of Beyblade, Chief Chirpa on Star Wars: Ewoks, and additional roles in Star Wars: Droids, The Busy World of Richard Scarry, Mythic Warriors: Guardians of the Legend, The Neverending Story, Babar, Hammerman, Jayce and the Wheeled Warriors, Grossology, Iggy Arbuckle, Dog City, Pecola, Monster Force, Franny's Feet Starlink: Battle for Atlas and Tales from the Cryptkeeper.

He also provided his voice in the English dubs of the Medabots and Power Stone video games.

Filmography

Film

High-Ballin' (1978) - Warehouseman
Fast Company (1979) - Meatball
The Amateur (1981) - Terrorist #4
Quest for Fire (1981) - The Kzamm Tribe
Highpoint (1982) - Alex
Martin's Day (1985) - Prison Guard 1
Meatballs III: Summer Job (1986) - Mean Gene
Busted Up (1986) - Captain Hook
The Last Season (1986) - Patterson
Oklahoma Smugglers (1987) - Hugo
Sticky Fingers (1988) - Policeman
The Brain (1988) - Varna
Destiny to Order (1989) - Burgundy Red
Snake Eater II: The Drug Buster (1989) - Rico
Stella (1990) - George
Straight Line (1990) - Big Boy
Open Season (1995) - Orly Travis
Pocahontas: The Legend (1995) - Jules
The Michelle Apts. (1995) - Burt
Henry & Verlin (1996) - Butch
Shoemaker (1996) - Jerry
The Arrangement (1999) - Willy Morton
X-Men (2000) - Trucker
Knockaround Guys (2001) - Earl at the Gun Shop
Duct Tape Forever (2002) - Motel Manager
Cold Creek Manor (2003) - Antique Dealer
Still Small Voices (2007) - Wife Beater Terrance Reed
Diary of The Dead (2007) - Tattooed Biker
Production Office (2008) - Big John
Camille (2008) - Motel Manager
You Might as Well Live (2009) - Bartender
The Mountie (2011) - Kleus
A Little Bit Zombie (2012) - Capt'n Cletus
Fish N Chips: The Movie (2013) - Chipsus Barbotus / The Admiral (voice)
The Christmas Switch (2014) - Burly Man
A Christmas Horror Story (2015) - Santa Claus / Norman
Mean Dreams (2016) - Pawnshop Clerk
Elliot the Littlest Reindeer (2018) - Santa Claus (voice)

Television
Star Wars: Droids (1985) - (voice)
Star Wars: Ewoks (1985) - Chief Chirpa (voice)
Maniac Mansion (1990-1993) - Turner Edison
X-Men Animated Series (1992-1997) - Beast / Dr. Henry 'Hank' McCoy (voice)
Tales from the Cryptkeeper (1993-1994) - William / Mr. Armstrong (voice)
Dog City (1994) - Steven (voice)
Spider-Man (1995) - Beast (voice)
The Neverending Story (1995-1996) - Ogre / East Wind 
The Adventures of Sinbad (1996-1998) - Doubar
Mythic Warriors: Guardians of the Legend (1998-1999) - King Minos / Gorgus (voice)
Power Stone (1999) - Kraken (voice, English Dub)
Monster by Mistake (1999) - Kragon (voice)
Noddy (2000) - Gus the Garbage Truck Driver
Beyblade (2001-2005) - Grandpa Granger (voice, English Dub)
Franny's Feet (2004-2005) - Grandpa (voice)
Grossology (2006-2007) - Sloppy Joe / Frankenbooger (voice)
Sidekick (2011) - Sheriff Marshall (voice)
The Case For Christmas (2011) - Kris Kringle (Santa Claus)
Elinor Wonders Why (2020) - Grandpa Rabbit / Baba (voice)

Video games
X-Men: Children of the Atom (1994) - Announcer / Colossus / Juggernaut / Omega Red / Magneto
Marvel vs. Capcom 2: New Age of Heroes (2000) - Colossus
X-Men: Mutant Academy 2 (2001) - Beast
Starlink: Battle for Atlas (2018) - Kharl Zeon

Awards and nominations
In 1992 he was nominated for a Gemini Award for Best Performance in a Comedy Program or Series (Individual or Ensemble) for Maniac Mansion. He was nominated again in 2001 for Best Ensemble Performance in a Comedy Program or Series for The Red Green Show.

References

External links

Canadian male film actors
Canadian male television actors
Canadian male video game actors
Canadian male voice actors
Male actors from Toronto
1949 births
Living people
American expatriates in Canada
Canadian people of American descent
Naturalized citizens of Canada